Gutenbach is a river of North Rhine-Westphalia, Germany. It springs north of Unterwilden, a district of Wilnsdorf. It is a right tributary of the Wildenbach in Salchendorf, a district of Neunkirchen.

See also
List of rivers of North Rhine-Westphalia

References

Rivers of North Rhine-Westphalia
Rivers of Germany